Empty Eyes is a 2001 Italian crime-drama film directed by Andrea Porporati.

Cast 
 Fabrizio Gifuni: Marco
 Gianni Cavina: Father of Marco
 Delia Boccardo: Mother of Marco
 Valerio Mastandrea: Agent Rinaldi
 Romuald Andrzej Klos: Mago Cilindro

References

External links

2001 films
Italian crime drama films
2001 crime drama films
2000s Italian films